Peter David Freyne (November 18, 1949 – January 7, 2009) was an American political journalist and columnist from the United States state of Vermont.

References

American political journalists
American columnists
1949 births
2009 deaths
Journalists from Vermont
20th-century American journalists
American male journalists
Writers from the Bronx